The University of Suwon (Hangul: 수원대학교) is a university in Hwaseong, Gyeonggi Province, South Korea.

Foundation 
The university was founded by the Kowoon Foundation in 1977 and authorized in 1981 with nine departments. The sister university, Suwon Science College, was founded in the same year. The first matriculation of 250 students took place in 1982.

International 
Since the university's first sisterhood relationship agreement with an overseas university was set up in 1985 with Chicago State University, agreements have been arranged with almost 100 universities in 23 countries.

Academic
The University of Suwon comprises 10 undergraduate schools. The first graduate school was opened in 1986 and USW now has eleven graduate schools.

Undergraduate schools

College of Humanities
 Department of Liberal Arts and Education
 International College (including ESL and CSL) 
 Department of Korean Language & Literature 
 Department of English Language & Literature 
 Department of History 
 Department of French Language & Literature 
 Department of Russian Language & Literature 
 Department of Chinese Language & Literature 
 Department of Japanese Language & Literature 
 Department of Theatre and Film

College of Law and Political Sciences
 Department of Law 
 Department of Public Administration (Day/Night) 
 Department of Journalism & Mass Communication

College of Economics and Business Administration
 Department of Economics & Finance
 Department of Business Administration 
 Department of Accounting 
 Department of Global Business
 Division of Hotel & Tourism

College of Human Ecology
 Department of Child & Family Welfare
 Department of Food & Nutrition 
 Department of Clothing & Textiles

College of Natural Sciences
 Department of Mathematics
 Department of Physics 
 Department of Life Science 
 Department of Chemistry 
 Department of Bioscience and Biotechnology 
 Department of Applied Statistics

College of Engineering
 Department of Civil Engineering 
 Department of Architectural Engineering 
 Department of Industrial Information Engineering 
 Department of Electronic Materials Engineering 
 Department of Urban Planning & Real Estate Department 
 Department of Mechanical Engineering 
 Department of Polymer Engineering 
 Department of Electrical Engineering 
 Department of Chemical Engineering 
 Department of Environmental Engineering 
 Department of Electronic Engineering

College of Information Technology
 Department of Computer 
 Department of Information and Telecommunications 
 Department of Internet Information Engineering 
 Department of Information Media

College of Physical Education
 Division of Physical Education 
 Major in Physical Education 
 Major in Sport & Leisure Studies 
 Department of Dance 
 Department Exercises & Qi-Gong Studies(Night)

College of Art & Design
 Division of Fine Arts 
 Major in Korean Painting 
 Major in Painting  
 Major in Sculpture
 Division of Design 
 Major in Communication Design 
 Major in Craft Design 
 Major in Fashion Design

College of Music
 Department of Composition 
 Department of Voice 
 Department of Piano
 Department of Orchestral Instruments 
 Department of Korean Traditional Music
 Department of Musicology

Graduate schools  
 Graduate School
 Graduate School of Public Administration
 Graduate School of Business Administration
 Graduate School of Engineering
 Graduate School of Education
 Graduate School of Social Welfare
 Graduate School of Financial Engineering
 Graduate School of Hotel & Tourism
 Graduate School of Art
 Graduate School of Music Technology
 Graduate School of Music

Campus and facilities

Library
The Main Library is divided into the study area and the research area. The study areas on the 1st and 2nd floors are open to everybody, while the research area can be accessed only through B.D.S. on the 3rd floor. Students, graduate students, and professors can engage in research work in the reference rooms on the 4th, 5th, and 6th floors. Since 1993 collections in the library have been added to the database and access to the database through the internet is available inside and outside the university. Since 1997 the library has operated the "electronic library" which enables the use of CD-ROM, microfilms, A/V materials, the satellite broadcasting system and on-line service.

Dormitory
The dormitory consists of three units with five floors and one basement. It is 12,572 m2 (3,800 pyeong) in size and can accommodate 900 students. It started housing students from September 2000. Dormitory rooms are not arranged in the corridor style that is usual in Korean universities. Instead, they are fashioned in the block style that most of the distinguished foreign universities adopt in order to create a family-like environment to share the community spirit and at the same time, keep the independence of each room. The dormitory, which stands on a sunny hill on the campus, helps to alleviate the inconvenience of students having to commute. It also adds to the academic atmosphere of the university and contributes to the social well-being of students from distant places.

Health 
USW Health Service Center is a student welfare organization that provides students with health care services to keep the campus healthy. Services provided include health care, medical treatment, environmental hygiene, and health education.

Amaranth Hall 
Amaranth Hall was constructed in September 2001 to promote students' welfare. In the basement of the hall, there are facilities such as a fitness center with ultramodern equipment, computer rooms with high speed internet access, a billiards room, and performance rooms for dance and play. On the first floor, there are facilities such as the students' dining room with a capacity of 400 seats, snack corner with 30 seats, a store and lounge. On the second floor are the faculty dining room, lounge and seminar room.

R.O.T.C. (Reserve Officers' Training Corps) 
The R.O.T.C. program was introduced to the university in 1984. Candidates are selected in March every year among applicants based on their academic performance and the results of a physical examination. Selected candidates who get good grades and serve as role models for others may get a scholarship. R.O.T.C. educates candidates in various courses such as military science, computer, and Chinese letters so that they may grow into leaders in the army and the modern society of information and industry. They are commissioned officers on completion of extended military training after graduation.

Annual events 
Each year, the Pegasus spring festival, named after the university symbol, is held in May. During this time, the streets on campus are closed to vehicles and crowded with students socializing and taking part in different events.
Pegasus sports competitions in athletics, football, basketball, foot volleyball, kickball and dodgeball take place in September.
The Founder's Day opening ceremony is held on September 25.

Adjunct institutes 
 Korean language institute
 Lifelong Education Center
 Suwon Science College

Notable people 

 Boom, entertainer
 Choi Jong-hoon, former singer (F.T. Island)
 Hwang Jung-eum, actress and singer (Sugar)
 Kim Seung-woo, actor
 Na Hyun-hee, actress and singer
 Oh Eun-sun, mountaineer
 Oh Won-bin, singer (F.T. Island)
 Ryu Jun-yeol, actor
 Shim Hyung-tak, actor
 Shin Sung-rok, actor
 So Yi-hyun, actress
 Lee Min-ji, actress

References

External links
Official homepage 
Official homepage 
International College
Central Library
Office of International Affairs

 
Universities and colleges in Gyeonggi Province
Hwaseong, Gyeonggi
Educational institutions established in 1977
1977 establishments in South Korea